The Punjab football team is an Indian football team representing Punjab in Indian state football competitions including the Santosh Trophy.

They have appeared in the Santosh Trophy finals 16 times and won the trophy 8 times.

Honours

State
 Santosh Trophy
 Winners (8): 1970–71, 1974–75, 1980–81, 1984–85, 1985–86, 1987–88, 2006–07, 2007–08
 Runners-up (8): 1977–78, 1979–80, 1983–84, 1994–95, 2004–05, 2009–10, 2014–15, 2018–19
National Games
 Gold medal (3): 1985, 2001, 2002
 Silver medal (3): 1997, 2011, 2015
 B.C. Roy Trophy
 Winners (5): 1985–86, 1992–93, 2001–02, 2015–16, 2016–17
 Runners-up (4): 1982–83, 1994–95, 2018–19, 2019–20
 Mir Iqbal Hussain Trophy
 Runners-up (4): 1989–90, 1990–91, 1995–96, 2009–10
 M. Dutta Ray Trophy
 Winners (2): 2003, 2008
 Runners-up (2): 2005, 2006

Others
 Bordoloi Trophy
 Runners-up (1): 1975

References

External links
 Punjab Football Association website

Football in Punjab, India
Santosh Trophy teams